Happy Land is a Philippine television informative children show broadcast by GMA Network. Hosted by Love Añover, Patricia Gayod and Jermaine Ulgasan, it premiered on June 6, 2009. The show concluded on April 3, 2010 with a total of 44 episodes.

Overview
The shortage of public early childhood care and development institutions in the Philippines challenged GMA News and Public Affairs to produce a definitive pre-school education program with the objective of shaping a whole new generation's viewpoint.

The United Nations Educational, Scientific, and Cultural Organization or (UNESCO) Education for All by 2015 report states that pre-primary education in the Philippines is available only to 41% of the total population, as most pre-schools are privately owned and concentrated in highly urbanized areas.
 
Happy Land's goal is to inspire young viewers to discover happiness despite the bad things in life.

Combining animation, digital technology, and live-action photography, Happy Land aims to bring Filipino children to a new level of TV viewing. Aside from the narrative, the show will also teach basic pre-school subjects like Language and the Alphabet, Math, Science, and General Knowledge through independent segments.

Hosts
 Love Añover as Ate Belle
 Patricia Gayod as Anna
 Jermaine Ulgasan as Buboy
 Joy Viado as Tita Auring

Extended cast
 Maey Bautista
 Betong Sumaya

Puppets
 Mingming
 Bulatelino
 Popoy
 Cocoy

Ratings
According to AGB Nielsen Philippines' Mega Manila household television ratings, the pilot episode of Happy Land earned a 13% rating. While the final episode scored a 6.7% rating.

Accolades

References

2009 Philippine television series debuts
2010 Philippine television series endings
Filipino-language television shows
GMA Network original programming
GMA Integrated News and Public Affairs shows
Philippine children's television series